The fifth season of the television series Dallas aired on CBS during the 1981–82 TV season.

Cast

Starring
In alphabetical order:
 Barbara Bel Geddes as Miss Ellie Ewing (24 episodes)
 Patrick Duffy as Bobby Ewing (26 episodes)
 Linda Gray as Sue Ellen Ewing (26 episodes)
 Larry Hagman as J.R. Ewing (26 episodes)
 Susan Howard as Donna Culver Krebbs (26 episodes)
 Steve Kanaly as Ray Krebbs (26 episodes)
 Ken Kercheval as Cliff Barnes (24 episodes)
 Victoria Principal as Pamela Barnes Ewing (26 episodes)
 Charlene Tilton as Lucy Ewing Cooper (24 episodes)

Also starring
 Leigh McCloskey as Mitch Cooper (19 episodes)
 Jared Martin as Steven "Dusty" Farlow (10 episodes)

Special guest stars
 Howard Keel as Clayton Farlow (21 episodes)
 Priscilla Pointer as Rebecca Barnes Wentworth (19 episodes)
 Audrey Landers as Afton Cooper (17 episodes)
 Barry Nelson as Arthur Elrod (3 episodes)
 William Smithers as Jeremy Wendell (1 episode)

Notable guest stars
Barry Corbin (Sheriff Fenton Washburn) returns for two episodes. Among the new additions to the cast are Deborah Rennard (Sly Lovegren), Morgan Brittany (Katherine Wentworth), Ray Wise (Blair Sullivan), Phyllis Flax (Mrs. Chambers) and Anne C. Lucas (Cassie, the waitress at the Oil Baron's Ball), who will continue to appear beyond the season. Dennis Redfield (Roger Larson), Art Hindle (Jeff Farraday) and Gretchen Wyler (Dr. Dagmara Conrad), all appear frequently during the season, but won't return for subsequent years. Knots Landing'''s Ted Shackelford and Joan Van Ark appear in two and one episodes, respectively. Also: future series star Barbara Stock, who will portray Liz Adams for the series' final two seasons, appears in two episodes as Heather Wilson.

Crew
The season's episode writers include showrunner Leonard Katzman, the returning Arthur Bernard Lewis, Linda B. Elstad, Howard Lakin, David Paulsen, and new additions Will Lorin and Bruce Shelly. Philip Capice serves as executive producer, Katzman as producer, and Cliff Fenneman as associate producer. Writer Arthur Bernard Lewis is billed supervising producer, after having served as executive story editor since season two. Linda B. Elstad, who has written episodes since the third season, serves as story editor.

DVD releaseDallas''' fifth season was released by Warner Bros. Home Video, on a Region 1 DVD box set of five double-sided DVDs, on August 1, 2006. In addition to the 26 episodes, it also includes the featurette "A Living Landmark, A Tour of the Real Southfork Ranch".

Episodes

References

External links
 List of Dallas season 5 episodes at the Internet Movie Database

1981 American television seasons
1982 American television seasons
Dallas (1978 TV series) seasons